"Innamoramento" is a 1999 song recorded by French singer-songwriter Mylène Farmer. It was the fifth single from her fifth studio album, Innamoramento, and was released on 18 July 2000. This pop ballad was written by Farmer with the music composed by Laurent Boutonnat. Lyrically, the song is about the need of love, and was accompanied by a music video directed by François Hanss which displays alternatively images of the singer on stage during her 1999 tour and in the Bois de Vincennes. "Innamoramento" received positive reviews from critics who generally praised the quality of the remixes and the concept of the music video. The song became Farmer's 20th top ten hit in France, reaching number three in the first week of release; however, the song was the less-selling single from the album.

Release
In June 2000, a luxurious cardboard cube was sent to the radio stations. Then, after many several postponements, the single was eventually released on 18 July 2000. There were two issues of the CD single "Innamoramento": the main one which contains a white disc, and the collector format printed in a limited edition which presents a picture CD. As both editions had the same cover, some fans bought several copies to obtain each kind of edition, which helped to increase the sales.

Lyrics
The song's title, which is the same as its parent album, is based on a Francesco Alberoni book, Le Choc amoureux, meaning Innamoramento in Italian and s'énamourer in Old French. Farmer explained that the song is about the fact of loving "in its larger spectrum". Journalist Benoît Cachin said the song deals with the themes of rebirth, love, and the questions that they raise. According to psychologist Hugues Royer, the song is "like the call of a solitude that wants to be broken".

Music video
The screenplay of the music video was written by Mylène Farmer. It was directed by François Hanss and produced by Requiem Publishing and Stuffed Monkey, with a budget of about 30,000 euros. Shot in two days in the Bois de Vincennes, it alternately shows Farmer wearing a long white dress, without makeup, lying on the grass, and images recorded during the concert "Mylenium Tour". The video ends with a close-up of Farmer.

According to Instant-Mag, the video shows roughly "the same visual as the first one from Live à Bercy (i.e. "Rêver") and seems to be a little repetitive. Indeed, there is "a blue and hushed atmosphere, a light and airy dress, a very present audience. The succession of images and the choice of camera angles (wide shots, overviews, zooms) show her desire for the stage and follow the same way, reinforcing the sense of déjà-vu (...). The whole is still saved by the insertion of country images, adding a personal touch." In spite of these criticisms, another issue of the magazine said that "the concept of the video was well-conceived and beautifully filmed".

Promotion and live performances
Farmer did not promote "Innamoramento" which was poorly broadcast on radio at the time. It was only sung during the 1999 Mylenium Tour, being the last song of the show. Farmer wore then a transparent white dress with a plunging neckline in the back, a sailing on the shoulders, shoes with high heels, and a large white necklace. The final refrain is sung four times, instead of two in the album version, in chorus with the audience, then Farmer went into the statue's hand.

Critical reception
The song generally enjoyed positive reviews from critics. Belgian newspaper La Dernière Heure described the song as being "pleasant, but not surprisingly, [with] a silky melody, twin of "Ainsi soit je..."". However, the covers of the various formats and the remixes were criticized. Gathering the various ideas expressed on the Internet on the matter, Instant-Mag said the picture of the CD single is a bit blurred and does not show Farmer clearly, and regarding the CD maxi, it stated that "the neo-cube assembly of the cover, which wants to be creative, falls completely flat. Colour selection suffers from the most complete tastelessness and the play of geometric shapes absorbs all the visuals". Regarding the remixes, author Erwan Chuberre considered these accelerated and techno versions a "treat". Similarly, French author Julien Rigal praised the remixes as being "successful", although musically different. More critical, Instant-Mag said some fans "expected more symphonic versions, such as those beautifully made, for example, for "Ainsi soit je..." and "Sans logique"", adding: "The 'darkness remix' amounts to a vague rhythmic (...); this pale copy [of Björk] does not have the best effect, although both the last two minutes are distinguished from the rest, they did not manage to redeem the whole". The 'anamor remix' is "too soft, slow, filled with strange noises sometimes verging on the ridiculous. Lastly, the 'momento dance mix', "although better than the two others, doesn't avoid the pitfall of the facility, the whole is slightly sprinkled with a little rhythm suggesting those of a boy band. It is nonetheless worthy of dancing".

Chart performance
In France, the single entered the singles chart at a peak of number three on 22 July 2000, making Farmer able for the first time to place the five singles from a same album in the top ten. Expert of French chart Élia Habib thinks this high debut was due to the "excitement which coincided with the week of the single's release", as the next week "Innamoramento" made a dizzy drop and was only placed at number 17. Then the single continued to drop and remained for a total of eleven weeks in the top 50 and twenty weeks in the top 100, becoming the lower-selling single from Innamoramento. "Innamoramento" briefly charted in Belgium (Wallonia), debuting at number 32 on the Ultratop 50 on 29 July 2000, then peaked at number 24 the week after, dropped and left the chart after six weeks. In Switzerland, the single peaked at number 56 on 20 August 2008 and stayed for seven weeks in the top 100.

Formats and track listings
These are the formats and track listings of single releases of "Innamoramento":

 CD single / CD single – Picture disc

 CD maxi – Digipack

 12" maxi / 12" maxi – promo

 CD single – Promo / CD single – Promo – Luxurious cube

 VHS – Promo

Official versions

Credits and personnel
These are the credits and the personnel as they appear on the back of the single:
 Mylène Farmer – lyrics
 Laurent Boutonnat – music
 Requiem Publishing – editions
 Polydor – recording company
 Claude Gassian – photo
 Henry Neu / Com'N.B – design
 Made in the E.U.

Charts

Weekly charts

Year-end charts

Release history

References

Notes

1999 songs
2000 singles
Mylène Farmer songs
Songs with lyrics by Mylène Farmer
Songs with music by Laurent Boutonnat
Polydor Records singles
2000s ballads